The 2006 Emerald Bowl, one of the 2006–07 NCAA football bowl games, was played on December 27, 2006, at AT&T Park in San Francisco, California. It featured the UCLA Bruins, and the Florida State Seminoles.

Game summary

Florida State scored first following a 25-yard touchdown run by Lorenzo Booker, making it 7–0 FSU. UCLA responded just 34 seconds later after quarterback Patrick Cowan threw a 78-yard touchdown pass to wide receiver Brandon Breazell to tie the game at 7–7. With 20 seconds left in the first quarter, Justin Medlock kicked a 46-yard field goal to put the Bruins up 10–7.

With 12:20 left in the half, Gary Cismesia kicked a 39-yard field goal to tie the game at 10. With 8:40 left in the half, Cowan found wide receiver Junior Taylor for a 7-yard touchdown pass, to put UCLA up 17–10. With 2:34 in the half, Medlock nailed a 19-yard field goal, increasing UCLA's lead to 20–10. Florida State answered with a 21-yard field goal from Gary Cismesia before halftime, making it 20-13 UCLA.

In the third quarter, Cismesia kicked a 36-yard field goal, pulling FSU to within 20–16. With 8:58 left in the quarter, Lawrence Timmons recovered a blocked punt, and returned it 25 yards for a touchdown, giving FSU a 23–20 lead. Chane Moline later scored on an 8-yard touchdown run, as UCLA reclaimed the lead at 27–23.

In the fourth quarter, Drew Weatherford threw a 30-yard touchdown pass to wide receiver Greg Carr, and Florida State took a 30–27 lead with 9:46 left in the game. Lorenzo Booker added a 3-yard touchdown run with 6:17, to increase the lead to 37–27. With 5:04 left in the game, Florida State sealed the deal with an 86-yard interception return by cornerback Tony Carter, making the final score 44–27, FSU.

Aftermath
On February 8, 2010, Florida State University agreed to accept NCAA sanctions against its athletic programs, and agreed to vacate 12 football victories, including the 2006 Emerald Bowl victory over UCLA. Florida State has stated their intention to return the championship trophy.

Although FSU lost the win as a result of the academic cheating scandal, UCLA is not permitted to count the game as a win.

References

External links
 Game summary at ESPN
 Game summary at USA Today

Emerald Bowl
Redbox Bowl
Florida State Seminoles football bowl games
UCLA Bruins football bowl games
December 2006 sports events in the United States
Emerald Bowl
2006 in San Francisco